Luci Shaw (born December 29, 1928) is a Christian writer of poetry and essays.

Background 

Shaw was born on December 29, 1928, in England. Her parents were medical missionaries, and she lived in Canada and Australia before moving to the United States to attend Wheaton College, Illinois. Shaw graduated from Wheaton in 1953 with high honors.

Shaw became a naturalized citizen of the United States in 1995.

Shaw is now Writer in Residence at Regent College, Vancouver. She lectures on art and spirituality, the Christian imagination, poetry-writing, and journaling as an aid to artistic and spiritual growth.

She has published ten volumes of poetry (several still in print) and numerous non-fiction books, and has edited and collaborated on multiple other works, including several with Madeleine L'Engle. Her poems are widely anthologized. Shaw usually works in free verse, and typically her poems are quite short, less than a page. Nevertheless, in tone and content, she affiliates most readily with the transcendental poets, often finding in natural details and themes the touch of the eternal or other-worldly.

She is a charter member of the Chrysostom Society, an organization of published writers which "serves the Christian community by promoting the development of quality literature."

Shaw married Harold Shaw and had five children: Robin, Marian, John, Jeffrey, and Kristin. Shaw and her husband started a publishing house, Harold Shaw Publishers, in the basement of their home in 1972. After Harold died from lung cancer in 1986, Shaw became president of Harold Shaw Publishers. Stephen Board became owner of Harold Shaw Publishers in 1990 and sold it to Random House's WaterBrook Press in 2000.

Shaw married John Hoyte in 1991. They are members of St. Paul's Episcopal Church in Bellingham, Washington, where they currently live.

Selected works

Poetry 
Listen to the Green (1973) 
The Secret Trees (1976)
The Sighting (1981)
Postcard from the Shore (1986)
Writing the River (1994)
The Angles of Light (2000)
The Green Earth (2002)
Water Lines (2003)
Polishing the Petoskey Stone (2003)
What the Light Was Like (2006)
Accompanied by Angels (2006)
Harvesting Fog (2010)
Scape (2013)
Thumbprint in the Clay (2016)
Sea Glass (2016)
Eye of the Beholder (2019)
The Generosity (2020)

Non-fiction 
Colossians: Focus on the Cross Fisherman Bible Studyguides (1982)
God in the Dark: Through Grief and Beyond (1989)
Life Path: Personal And Spiritual Growth through Journal Writing (1991)
Horizons: Exploring Creation with Timothy Botts (1992)
Friends for the Journey with Madeleine L'Engle (1997) 
Water My Soul: Cultivating the Interior Life; foreword by Eugene Peterson (2003)
WinterSong: Christmas Readings with Madeleine L'Engle (2004) 
The Crime of Living Cautiously: Hearing God's Call to Adventure (2005)
Adventure of Ascent: Field Notes from a Lifelong Journey (2014)

Use in music 

A number of Shaw's works have been set to music, by a variety of composers:

 Alan Cline used "God in the Dark" as the basis for a cantata.
 Knut Nystedt (Norwegian composer) did a setting for "Mary's Song", sung and recorded by the Elektra Choir of Vancouver, British Columbia, Canada and appears on their album, Child of Grace.
 Alice Parker (American) set three of Shaw's poems for a song cycle.
 Frederick Frahm (American) composed settings for solo and choir for three of Shaw's poems, "Star Song," "Down He Came From Up," and "Heart Stable". Frahm also composed a Cantata for Michaelmas based on Shaw's poem “Angel Vision" and a Christmas Cantata (“From East to West”) based on texts by Shaw.
 Ed Henderson (Canadian) composed a choral setting for "Star Song".
 Roland Fudge (English) composed a choral setting for "One", "Celestial Light", and "Steadfast Taper".

References

External links 

 Luci Shaw's website
 Luci Shaw on Twitter

1928 births
Living people
Anglican poets
Christian poets
American Episcopalians
Wheaton College (Illinois) alumni
Writers from London
Christian writers
British emigrants to the United States